The First Sangam period or the First Academy, also known as the Head Sangam period, was a legendary period in the history of Ancient Tamilakam said to be the foremost of Tamil Sangams, known in the Tamil language as கூடல் (koodal) or 'gathering'. It is the first of three Tamil Sangams of Classical Tamil literature. While most historians accept the historicity of this literature, they also understand that some literary academies would have held Pandyan patronage. This is not to be confused with the historical Third Sangam period which lasted roughly from 600 BCE to 300 CE.

Formation
It was said to be located in Then Madurai under the patronage of 89 Pandya kings, during this period. It is said to have lasted for 4,440 years, and this would put the First Sangam between 9600 BCE to 5200 BCE.

Some are of the opinion that Agathiyar was the head of the Head Sangam period. However, this is unlikely as the first mention of him is from Ptolemy and no Sangam work refers to him. A more likely proposition is Lord Muruga (Kartikeya) being the head of the First Sangam as believed by others.

Activity

Its function was to judge literary works and credit their worth. Later literary works like Iraiyanar Akaporul mention that 549 poets were members of it including Shiva, Murugan, Kuperan and seven Pandya kings. And 16,149 authors attended the convocation. Its chief works were Perumparipadal, Mudukuruku, Mudunarai and Kalariyavirai. It used Agattiyam as its grammar. There are no surviving works from this period.

Muranjiyur Mudinagar, a member of the first Tamil Sangam, is believed to have been a king of the Nagas in Jaffna. Siddha medicine is said to have been practiced during the First Sangam, and people "enjoyed mental and bodily health, respecting nature and living hygienically."

Destruction

Iraiyanar Kalaviyal mentions a King Kadungon was the last ruler during the Talaiccankam. He is not to be confused with Kadungon who defeated the Kalabhras. It was washed away in a sea-deluge. This led to the Middle Sangam period.

See also 
 Tamil Sangams
 Madurai Tamil Sangam

References

Tamil-language literature
Cultural history of Tamil Nadu
Ancient Tamil Nadu
Tamil history